George Brown, nicknamed "Tanna", was a Negro league outfielder in the 1940s.

Brown made his Negro leagues debut in 1942 with the Cincinnati Buckeyes. In his only professional season, Brown recorded two hits in nine plate appearances over three games.

References

External links
 and Seamheads

Place of birth missing
Place of death missing
Year of birth missing
Year of death missing
Cincinnati/Cleveland Buckeyes players
Baseball outfielders